Fernandina's flicker (Colaptes fernandinae) is a species of bird in the woodpecker family. Endemic to Cuba, its small population of 600–800 birds makes it one of the most endangered species of woodpecker in the world. It is threatened by habitat loss.

Description
Fernandina's flicker is a medium-sized woodpecker, ranging in length from 14–15 inches (33–35 cm). Overall, it is mostly yellowish-tan, covered with varying amounts of black barring; its underwings are yellow. The male has a black mustachial stripe, which the female lacks.

Distribution and habitat
Fernandina's flicker is endemic to Cuba.  Though it was apparently never common, it was formerly found across the island. Now, however, it is restricted to isolated locations in nine of the country's 15 provinces: Camagüey, Cienfuegos, Granma, Holguín, Las Tunas, Matanzas, Pinar del Río, Santiago de Cuba, and Villa Clara. The largest population is found in Zapata Swamp, where some 120 pairs are estimated to live, though this number may have dropped following recent hurricanes.

Fernandina's flicker's natural habitats include dry forests, dry savanna, swamps, and pastures.

Behavior
Though not a particularly social bird, Fernandina's flicker will sometimes form loose colonies of up to 15 pairs. It regularly fights with other woodpeckers.

Feeding
Like its congeners, Fernandina's flicker often forages—primarily for ants, but also for other insects, worms, grubs and seeds—on the ground. It uses its strong bill to probe the ground and flick aside leaf litter.

Breeding
Fernandina's flicker breeds between March and June; during courtship, pairs regularly engage in high-flying chases. Like all woodpeckers, it is a cavity nester. Recent fieldwork has shown that it prefers to use nest holes started by West Indian woodpeckers (Melanerpes superciliaris); the flicker drives off the original owners, finishes off the excavation work, and moves in. The female lays a clutch of three to five white eggs, which are incubated for a period of about 18 days. The young fledge after 22 days.

Voice
Though it is regularly silent, Fernandina's flicker's calls include a repeated wicka (the onomatopoeic sound which gives the genus its common name), and a loud series of pic notes.

Conservation
With an estimated population of only 600–800 birds, Fernandina's flicker is one of the most endangered woodpecker species in the world. Overall, that population is declining, principally because of habitat loss. Farming, logging, hurricane damage and the caged bird trade—trappers bring down whole palm trees in order to capture nestling Cuban amazons (Amazona leucocephala leucocephala)—are combining to squeeze the remaining birds into smaller and smaller isolated tracts. In addition, West Indian woodpeckers have been observed killing the chicks of Fernandina's flickers.

Sources

Citations

References

External links
Fernandina's flicker photos from the Visual Resources for Ornithology department of the Philadelphia Academy of Natural Sciences
Fernandina's flicker videos from Handbook of the Birds of the World's Internet Bird Collection
Fernandina's flicker on stamps

Fernandina's flicker
Endemic birds of Cuba
Fernandina's flicker
Taxonomy articles created by Polbot
Taxa named by Nicholas Aylward Vigors